The 1991 Independence Bowl was a post-season college football bowl game between the Arkansas Razorbacks and the Georgia Bulldogs. Georgia defeated Arkansas, 24–15.

Setting

Arkansas and Georgia had met in three previous bowl games: the 1969 Sugar Bowl, with Arkansas taking a 16–2 decision, the 1976 Cotton Bowl Classic, which Arkansas also won 31–10, and the 1987 Liberty Bowl, which Georgia won 20-17. Georgia's head coach Ray Goff played quarterback in the 1976 Cotton Bowl loss to Arkansas.

Arkansas

With the Southwest Conference dying, Arkansas athletic director Frank Broyles had engineered a deal for Arkansas to move to the flourishing Southeastern Conference. Arkansas' final season before the move was in 1991 when the Razorbacks finished the regular season at 6–5.

Georgia

Georgia defeated #6 Clemson, but lost to an unranked Vanderbilt team to enter the game at 8–3.

Game summary
Georgia began the scoring early, throwing two touchdown passes from Eric Zeier to take an early 14–0 lead. After Georgia added a second-quarter field goal, Arkansas finally got on the board when E. D. Jackson rushed in from seven yards out. After halftime, Georgia's Andre Hastings broke a 53-yard touchdown run. Jackson would again score for the Hogs, and add a two-point conversion. However, the Hogs couldn't score again and fell short, 24–15.

References

Independence Bowl
Independence Bowl
Arkansas Razorbacks football bowl games
Georgia Bulldogs football bowl games
December 1991 sports events in the United States
1991 in sports in Louisiana